Fu Zhihuan (born March 1938) is a politician of the People's Republic of China, and an academician of the Chinese Academy of Engineering. He served as the Minister of Railways of China from March 1998 to 2003.

Fu was a member of 15th Central Committee of the Chinese Communist Party.

References 

1938 births
Living people
Members of the Chinese Academy of Engineering
People's Republic of China politicians from Heilongjiang
Chinese Communist Party politicians from Heilongjiang
Politicians from Harbin
Engineers from Heilongjiang
Railway civil engineers